Soojin Chang is a California-born, Glasgow-based performance artist, art director and filmmaker.

Notable works include the animated visuals provided for Brooklyn-based musician Shilpa Ray’s track “Burning Bride and the State of Possession – Performance at the ICA in London which provided support for the band These New Puritans.

Biography
Chang was born in San Francisco, California and graduated from the University of California, Berkeley where she studied English. She is in the MFA program at the Glasgow School of Art.

References

Living people
Year of birth missing (living people)
American art directors
American performance artists
Filmmakers from California
UC Berkeley College of Letters and Science alumni
American emigrants to Scotland
Alumni of the Glasgow School of Art